Khin Wint Wah (also spelt Khin Wint War; birth name Chaw Su Hlaing born on 21 September 1994) is a Burmese actress, commercial model and beauty pageant title holder. She was crowned the Miss Supranational Myanmar 2013 and represented Myanmar at the Miss Supranational 2013 and won four continental titles.

Khin was listed in 12 Shortlisted World Top Bell “Most Beautiful Girl of the Year 2013” along with Moe Set Wine, selected by The Beauties Concept.

Early life and education
Khin Wint Wah was born on 21 September 1994 in Yangon, Myanmar to parents Hla Han and Kyi Kyi Swe. She is the youngest of four siblings, having a brother and two sisters. She attended at Basic Education High School No. 2 Bahan. She studied botany at Dagon University until second year and then switched to distance education at the Yangon University and graduated with BSc. Botany.

Pageantry

Miss Supranational Myanmar 2013
Khin previously competed at the Miss MK Gem 2012 and won "Queen of Beauty Award ". She competed in Miss Supranational Myanmar 2013 which was held on 21 May 2013 in Yangon. She became the winner of Miss Supranational Myanmar after the competition.

Miss Supranational 2013
She represented Myanmar at the Miss Supranational 2013 pageant which was held on 17 August to 6 September in Minsk, Belarus, along with beauties from 98 other nations. She was placed in the top 20 and won four continental titles for Miss Internet Award, Most Beauty Girl in the World Award, People Choice Award and Face of Miss Supranational Award.

Acting career

2014: Beginnings and film debut
Khin Wint Wah started her acting career, after the competition in Miss Supranational 2013. She made her acting debut with the Burmese film Fairy and Me, where she played the leading role with an actor Kaung Pyae and directed by Kyi Phyu Shin in 2014.

2016–present: Breaking into the big screen and success
In 2016, she took on her first big-screen leading role in the romance film Thingyan Pyatike (Thingyan Museum) alongside Sai Sai Kham Leng, directed by Maung Myo Min (Yin Twin Phit), and which screened in Myanmar cinemas on 1 April 2016. She has been acting in over 30 big screen movies and over 80 direct-to-videos in her acting career.

Brand ambassadorships
Khin was appointed as brand ambassador for Camella Cosmetic, Daw Win Garment and Line Myanmar in 2014. And also appointed as brand ambassador of Oppo from 2015 to 2016, and re-appointed as brand ambassador of Oppo for F3 smartphone from 2016 to 2017.
In 2018, she was appointed as brand ambassador for Sofy Eva.

Humanitarian works
In 2013 October, Khin Wint Wah visited the Myanmar Greenland Youth Development Center in Hlegu Township, together with Miss Supranational Myanmar Organization team, and donate food and clothes to orphan children.

She also participated in the concert for the river's flood victims, which erupted in 2015. Collecting funds, and donated to flood victims in the effected regions.

Political activities
Following the 2021 Myanmar coup d'état, Khin Wint Wah was active in the anti-coup movement both in person at rallies and through social media. Denouncing the military coup, she has taken part in protests since February. She joined the "We Want Justice" three-finger salute movement. The movement was launched on social media, and many celebrities have joined the movement.

On 2 April 2021, warrants for her arrest were issued under section 505 (a) of the Myanmar Penal Code by the State Administration Council for speaking out against the military coup. Along with several other celebrities, she was charged with calling for participation in the Civil Disobedience Movement (CDM) and damaging the state's ability to govern, with supporting the Committee Representing Pyidaungsu Hluttaw, and with generally inciting the people to disturb the peace and stability of the nation.

Filmography

Film (Big Screen Movies)

 Thingyan Museum (2016)
 Cho Myain Thaw Let Sar Chay Chin (2017)
 Kyauk Kyauk Kyauk (2017)
 Bridge of Clouds (2018)
 Shal Chway Ma (2018)
 Palpitation in the Breeze (2019)
 Mite Mae Chit (2020)

Film

 Over 80 films

TV series
A Kyin Nar Myit Phyar (2019)

References

External links

1994 births
Living people
Burmese beauty pageant winners
Burmese film actresses
Burmese female models
21st-century Burmese actresses
People from Yangon